Murder Can Hurt You (stylized onscreen as Murder Can Hurt You!) is a 1980 American made-for-television comedy film that parodies detective and police TV shows of the 1960s and 1970s, much as Murder by Death spoofed literary detectives. The film was directed by Roger Duchowny.

Plot
A mysterious "Man in White" is out to kill famous detectives in bizarre ways, and the heroes are obvious parodies of Kojak, Baretta, Starsky and Hutch, Ironside, Police Woman, Columbo, Mrs. Columbo, and McCloud.

The movie starts with the Man In White killing Lambretta, after which Lt. Nojack calls a meeting of all the best detectives in the city. During this meeting the man in white threatens to kill them all, locks them in their meeting room, and sets a bomb to kill them all while he makes his escape.

The Aaron Spelling Productions logo at the end pays homage to Mark VII Limited, using a hammer and stamp.

Cast

References

External links
 
 
 Murder Can Hurt You at MSN Movies

1980 television films
1980 films
1980s parody films
American parody films
American television films
Comedy mystery films
Films scored by Artie Kane
Films with screenplays by Ron Friedman
1980s English-language films
1980s American films